Babacar Pouye (born 2 February 1968) is a Senegalese sprinter. He competed in the men's 4 × 100 metres relay at the 1988 Summer Olympics.

References

1968 births
Living people
Athletes (track and field) at the 1988 Summer Olympics
Senegalese male sprinters
Olympic athletes of Senegal
Place of birth missing (living people)